Los negocios de mamá is a Spanish comedy television series starring Rocío Dúrcal and José Sancho and directed by Luis Sanz. It aired in 1997 on La Primera.

Premise 
The storyline focuses on Ana (Rocío Dúrcal), a pro-business entrepreneur and mother of three children (played by María Adánez, Fernando Cuesta and Zoe Berriatúa), who decides to set up her own business, the clothing shop 'Ana Suma y Sigue'. Her husband (played by José Sancho) was a progressive of the generation of '68.

Cast

Production and release 
Produced by Televisión Española (TVE) and Videozapping, directed by Luis Sanz, and filmed at the TVE's studios in Prado del Rey, the series premiered on 7 April 1997 on La Primera. The first seven episodes aired averaged 2,900,000 viewers and a 16.9% audience share. Unable to overcome the viewership figures of its prime time rival Querido maestro, the series was cancelled after the 7th episode (aired on 19 May 1997), earned a 15.1% audience share. The network decided to not air six completed episodes. The episodes had a running time of around 50 minutes.

References 
Informational notes

Citations

1990s Spanish comedy television series
1997 Spanish television series debuts
1997 Spanish television series endings
La 1 (Spanish TV channel) network series
Television shows filmed in Spain
Spanish-language television shows